Protein kinase C eta type is an enzyme that in humans is encoded by the PRKCH gene.

Protein kinase C (PKC) is a family of serine- and threonine-specific protein kinases that can be activated by calcium and the second messenger diacylglycerol. PKC family members phosphorylate a wide variety of protein targets and are known to be involved in diverse cellular signaling pathways. PKC family members also serve as major receptors for phorbol esters, a class of tumor promoters. Each member of the PKC family has a specific expression profile and is believed to play a distinct role in cells. The protein encoded by this gene is one of the PKC family members. It is a calcium-independent and phospholipids-dependent protein kinase. It is predominantly expressed in epithelial tissues and has been shown to reside specifically in the cell nucleus. This protein kinase can regulate keratinocyte differentiation by activating the MAP kinase MAPK13 (p38delta)-activated protein kinase cascade that targets CCAAT/enhancer-binding protein alpha (CEBPA). It is also found to mediate the transcription activation of the transglutaminase 1 (TGM1) gene.

References

Further reading

EC 2.7.11